Joseph Randle Thomas (born March 9, 1948) is an American former forward who played in the National Basketball Association (NBA). He was drafted in the sixth round of the 1970 NBA draft by the Phoenix Suns and would play the 1970–71 NBA season with the team.

After his brief professional basketball career ended, Thomas earned his juris doctor (J.D.) in 1975 and practiced law for over 30 years.

References

External links
College stats @ sports-reference.com

1948 births
Living people
People from Canton, Georgia
Basketball players from Georgia (U.S. state)
Marquette Golden Eagles men's basketball players
Phoenix Suns draft picks
Phoenix Suns players
Small forwards
Sportspeople from the Atlanta metropolitan area